OpenLTE is an open source implementation of the 3GPP LTE specifications. In the current version, it includes an eNodeB with a built-in simple Evolved Packet Core, and some tools for scanning and recording LTE signals based on GNU Radio. 

OpenLTE is used extensively in a variety of projects, from deployment of custom built 4G cellular networks, evaluating dynamic spectrum sharing for 5G NR and 4G LTE Coexistence to penetration testing of existing telecom networks.

See also 
Universal Software Radio Peripheral
LTE (telecommunication)
E-UTRA

References

External links 
 Telecom vulnerability testing
 Dynamic Spectrum Sharing for 5G NR and 4G LTE Coexistence

LTE (telecommunication)
Software-defined radio
Software using the GNU AGPL license